The VII Central American Games (Spanish: VII Juegos Deportivos Centroamericanos) was a multi-sport event that took place between 22 November and 3 December 2001.

The games were opened by Harris Whitbeck as a
delegate for Guatemalan president Alfonso Portillo.  Torch lighter was
Taekwondo fighter Euda Carías.

Participation
A total of 2,182 athletes from 7 countries were reported to participate: 

 (149)
 (309)
 (494)
 (564)
 (334)
 (189)
 Panamá (143)

Sports
The competition featured 363 events (215 men, 135 women, 13 mixed) in 37 disciplines from 29 official sports (plus roller speed skating as exhibition event).  

Aquatic sports
 Diving
 Swimming
 Synchronized swimming
 Water polo
 Archery
 Athletics
 Baseball
 Basketball
 Bodybuilding
 Bowling
 Boxing
 Chess
 Cycling
 Equestrian
 Fencing
Football
 Football
 Futsal
 Gymnastics
 Handball
 Judo
 Karate
 Racquetball
 Roller speed skating†
 Rowing
 Shooting
 Softball
 Squash
 Table tennis
 Taekwondo
 Tennis
 Triathlon
Volleyball
 Beach volleyball
 Volleyball
 Weightlifting
 Wrestling

†: Exhibition contest

Medal table
The table below is taken from Costa Rican newspaper La Nación, Nicaraguan medals are from  El Nuevo Diario, Managua, Nicaragua.

References 

 
Central American Games
Central American Games
International sports competitions hosted by Guatemala
Central American Games
2001 in Central American sport
Multi-sport events in Guatemala